Brainwashed is the second studio album by British metalcore band While She Sleeps. It was released on 23 March 2015 through Search and Destroy Records. The album was produced by Carl Bown.

Release and promotion
Four tracks taken from the album were revealed prior to release, each with accompanying videos that were available to download instantly from iTunes. "New World Torture", "Four Walls" (premiered exclusively on Gigwise), "Trophies of Violence" and "Our Legacy". To support the album, the band embarked on a co-headline tour with Cancer Bats in April 2015, while also playing 2015's Warped Tour.

Critical reception

The album received positive reviews from critics. Tony Bliss from Dead Press! rated the album positively calling it: "Brainwashed is a rallying call, harnessing the intense power of all their past personal pressure and recapturing that thrumming, era defining vitality which sees them remain scene kingpins. We can tell that While She Sleeps have come back from the very brink, and they sound all the more unified for it. A more than welcome return."

Commercial performance
The album was included at number 27 on Rock Sounds top 50 releases of 2015 list.

Track listing

Personnel
Credits adapted from Discogs.

While She Sleeps
 Lawrence "Loz" Taylor – lead vocals
 Sean Long – lead guitar, backing vocals
 Mat Welsh – rhythm guitar, vocals, piano, artwork, design
 Aaran McKenzie – bass, backing vocals
 Adam "Sav" Savage – drums, percussion, artwork, design

Additional personnel
 Carl Bown – production, engineering, mixing
 Jim Pinder – engineering
 Drew Lawson – vocal engineering
 Colin Richardson – mixing
 Ted Jensen – mastering
 Giles Smith and Tom Welsh – photography

Release history

References
 Citations

Sources

 

2015 albums
While She Sleeps albums
Search and Destroy Records albums
Sony Music albums
Razor & Tie albums